Marcelo Germán Montoya (born 23 January 1983) is an Argentine professional footballer who plays as a goalkeeper for Agropecuario.

Club career
Montoya started his professional career with Belgrano in the 2000 Apertura of the Primera División. He became a starter for Belgrano during the 2006 Clausura of the Primera B Nacional (second division), relegating Colombian international Róbinson Zapata to the bench. Belgrano was promoted at the end of the season and Montoya played his first full season in the first division in the 2006–07. However, his team was relegated at the end of the season.

After Belgrano's relegation, Montoya stayed in the first division, being transferred to Vélez Sársfield. At first, he was a substitute for Sebastián Peratta, but became a starter from the 12th fixture onwards due to a knee injury suffered by Peratta. During the 2008 Apertura, Montoya was originally a starter, but was relegated by Marcelo Barovero by the end of the tournament. Subsequently, when Ricardo Gareca replaced Hugo Tocalli as the team's coach for the 2009 Clausura, Montoya regained his position as a starter. Vélez won the tournament and Montoya had the lowest goals-to-games ratio, therefore being awarded the Ubaldo Fillol Award.

During the 2010 Apertura, Montoya lost his place again to Barovero, and played only when the new starter was injured. He was later an un-used substitute in Vélez' 2011 Clausura winning campaign.

In 2016, Montoya signed for Atletico Rafaela. Six months later, he rejoined former club Belgrano.

Honours 
Vélez Sársfield
Argentine Primera División (4): 2009 Clausura, 2011 Clausura, 2012 Inicial, 2012–13 Superfinal

Individual
Ubaldo Fillol Award (1): 2009 Clausura (with Vélez Sársfield)

References

External links
 Profile at Vélez Sársfield official website 
 Argentine Primera statistics at Fútbol XXI  
 

1983 births
Living people
Footballers from Córdoba, Argentina
Argentine footballers
Association football goalkeepers
Argentine Primera División players
Primera Nacional players
Club Atlético Belgrano footballers
Club Atlético Vélez Sarsfield footballers
Club Atlético Colón footballers
Club Atlético Independiente footballers
Atlético de Rafaela footballers
21st-century Argentine people